Gruithuisen is a lunar impact crater that lies on the section of lunar mare that joins Oceanus Procellarum in the west to Mare Imbrium in the east. Southeast of Gruithuisen is the small crater Delisle. To the south is Dorsum Bucher, a wrinkle ridge running in a north–south direction for about 90 kilometers.

The rim of Gruithuisen is relatively smooth and circular, projecting only slightly above the surrounding mare. The interior is relatively featureless with a small floor, with mounds of material deposited along the edges of the sloping inner walls.

To the north of the crater, along the edge of the highland peninsula between the two maria is a domed mountainous rise that is designated Mons Gruithuisen Gamma (γ). Just to the east of this feature is another mountainous rise named Mons Gruithuisen Delta (δ). Northwest of Gruithuisen crater is concentrated cluster of several craterlets, which was most likely formed from a single body that broke up just prior to impact.

Satellite craters
By convention these features are identified on lunar maps by placing the letter on the side of the crater midpoint that is closest to Gruithuisen.

References

 
 
 
 
 
 
 
 
 
 
 
 

Impact craters on the Moon